There are many Spanish people of Filipino ancestry, consisting of the descendants of early migrants from the Philippines to Spain, as well as more recent migrants. Some 200,000 Filipinos are estimated to live in Spain, including 37,000 expatriates from the Philippines living in Spain who do not hold Spanish citizenship.

Filipino migration to Spain has a long history owing to the Philippines being a Spanish possession for much of its history. While Filipino migration within the Spanish Empire was recorded as early as the 16th century, the first Filipino migrants to metropolitan Spain only began arriving in the late 19th century, forming the country's first and oldest Asian immigrant community, although mass migration would not begin until after Philippine independence. Rapid growth in the community since the 1990s has led to Filipinos in Spain forming one of the largest Filipino diaspora communities in Europe.

Historically one of the country's largest Asian minority groups, today Filipinos rank alongside the Chinese and Pakistanis as among one of Spain's three largest Asian minorities. Most Filipinos in Spain overwhelmingly live in the country's two largest cities, Madrid and Barcelona, with smaller communities present in the rest of the country.

History

The first Filipino settlements in Spain date back to the Spanish colonial period of the Philippines between the 16th and 19th century, although most  migration from the Philippines to Spain during this period was to the territories of New Spain, where some 3,600 Asians – mostly Filipinos working on the Manila galleons – migrated to between 1565 and 1700.

Migration to metropolitan Spain from the Philippines was practically non-existent for most of the islands' history under Spanish rule, and didn't begin until the end of the 19th century, when the ilustrados, largely from the middle and upper classes, pursued higher education in Spain. By 1880, some 200 Filipinos, including figures such as José Rizal, were living in Spain to pursue higher education, and although they would form Spain's first and oldest Asian immigrant community, many from this group of migrants would return to the Philippines later on in the wake of the Philippine Revolution. Intermittent migration from this period would continue until the early American colonial period when, starting in the 1920s, economic ties between the Philippines and Spain began to be cut in favor of ties with the United States. By the end of the Spanish Civil War, the Filipino community in Spain was estimated to only number at least 200 people.

Contemporary migration to Spain from the Philippines can be broken down into three waves. The first wave of Filipino migration to Spain consisted primarily of Spanish Filipinos and Spaniards in the Philippines who would leave the country after World War II and in the first years after Philippine independence, beginning with some 300 survivors of the Battle of Manila who left the country onboard two ships, the Plus Ultra and the Halekala. Contemporary economic migration did not begin until the 1960s, when a second wave of migrants moved to Spain as domestic workers, largely women in the employ of Spanish businessmen who in that period decided to return to Spain from the Philippines while bringing their domestic helpers along with them. This was followed by a third wave that began in the 1980s, whose members replaced those of the second wave who had since migrated to other countries, particularly the United States and Canada. The later two waves of migration significantly changed the makeup of the Filipino community in Spain, as later arrivals were typically of a lower social class and had few (if any) ties to Spain compared to the existing community established by the smaller first wave of migrants, whose members were wealthier and had more ties to Spain.

Overseas Filipino Workers were not formally deployed to Spain in large numbers until 2006, when the two countries signed a memorandum of understanding on the entry of skilled labor, leading to the deployment of some 160 Filipino nurses and caregivers to nursing homes throughout Spain. The agreement, which would allow for up to 200,000 Filipino workers to enter Spain, also paved the way for other highly-skilled professionals like engineers and doctors to migrate to the country. This led to significant growth in the community: while there were only 25,000 Filipinos in Spain in 1992, this grew to over 40,000 by 2006, and to over 50,000 by the following year.

Demographics

Population and distribution
There are over 200,000 Filipinos in Spain as of 2018, and the Instituto Nacional de Estadística estimates that there are 53,388 persons in Spain who were born in the Philippines, including 37,355 Filipino citizens registered in municipal registers throughout Spain, as of 2021. While Filipinos in Spain come from various parts of the Philippines, most originate from Luzon, with Tagalogs, Ilocanos and Bicolanos being the most numerous. As Filipinos can apply for citizenship after only two years' residence in Spain, some 2,000 Filipinos acquire Spanish nationality every year, a phenomenon which began in the 1990s, and it is believed that the actual number of Filipinos in Spain – including those who have since become Spanish citizens – could be as high as 300,000 or more.

Some three quarters of all Filipino migration to Spain is to the Community of Madrid and Catalonia, which are home to the oldest Filipino communities in Spain, and a distribution that is shared with Peruvians and Dominicans as communities that are particularly concentrated in these two autonomous communities. Smaller populations of Filipinos are also found in Spain's other autonomous communities, with the largest concentrations found in Andalusia, the Balearic Islands and the Canary Islands. For historical reasons, most Filipino migrants to Spain were working-age women, which is still reflected in the contemporary makeup of the community.

Major Filipino enclaves are found in the cities of Madrid and Barcelona, where most Filipinos in Spain live. In Madrid, most Filipinos live in the district of Tetuán, forming the largest immigrant group in four of the district's six neighborhoods, as well as in four other neighborhoods in other parts of the city, including the neighborhood of El Viso in neighboring Chamartín, which is home to the Philippine Embassy in Madrid. Meanwhile, about half of all Filipinos living in Barcelona live in the district of Ciutat Vella, with significant populations also found in the Eixample and Sants-Montjuïc districts. The community is primarily concentrated in the northern half of El Raval in Ciutat Vella, which is reportedly home to fifteen percent of all Filipino citizens in Spain and is also home to most of the local community's cultural and social institutions. In Andalusia, a more diffuse community is found in Málaga, with some 5,000 Filipinos residing in the eponymous province, including a significant community in Marbella, and a smaller community of some 300 in Seville. Beyond the peninsula in the Balearic Islands, some 2,500 Filipinos live on the islands of Ibiza and Formentera, and another 2,000 on Mallorca, while in the Canaries, communities are found in Las Palmas, where over 1,000 Filipinos live, and on the island of Tenerife.

Employment
Before 2006, Filipinos who went to Spain for work typically did so as domestic helpers, and most Filipinos in Spain still work either as domestic helpers or in adjacent service industries, including in the restaurant industry, as hotel workers, and as house cleaners. Beyond the service sector, Filipinos are also employed as teachers, farm workers in rural Spain, nurses, language assistants, and military personnel. For Filipinos looking to migrate overseas, Spain is seen as an attractive destination due to its robust labor laws and generous pay and employment benefits, as well as the relative ease of obtaining legal residence in the country compared to other countries in Europe.

In recent years, Filipinos in Spain have also begun setting up their own businesses, with a number of Filipino restaurants, bars, bakeries, grocery stores and call shops, among other businesses, setting up shop in Tetuán, El Raval, and Las Palmas, as well as in other parts of the country. Wealthy Filipinos have also spurred demand for Spain's immigrant investor program.

Community issues

Education
Although a significant proportion of Filipinos who migrate to Spain are highly educated, many are underemployed due to difficulties in getting their credentials recognized in Spain. Filipinos who want to exercise their profession in Spain are deterred by the high cost of homologation and the need to return to school despite already being certified in the Philippines, leaving them unable to find employment and forcing them to take lower-skilled jobs. Nurses, for example, have only been able to practice their profession as a result of the COVID-19 pandemic in Spain after working other jobs, where otherwise they wouldn't have been able to do so.

Language
New Filipino migrants to Spain are often not fluent in Spanish nor, if such is the case, the regional language of their autonomous community. In a 2020 survey, more than half of all surveyed Filipino migrants on Ibiza reported not being fluent in either Spanish or Catalan, although they were generally fluent in English, Filipino and/or other languages of the Philippines. While a lack of Spanish fluency has led to many Filipinos being underemployed, English fluency is a reported advantage for the community, as Filipinos often find work in the employ of other non-Spanish speaking foreigners.

Fluency in Spanish and regional languages increases with the children of migrants who are born in Spain, as they learn those languages in school along with English and other foreign languages. While they become native Spanish speakers, unlike their parents, it often comes at the expense of learning Filipino and other Philippine languages.

Notable people

Filipinos in Spain
 Bea Alonzo, actress
 Carlos Celdran, tour guide and activist
 Félix Resurrección Hidalgo, artist
 Antonio and Juan Luna, revolutionaries
 Antonio "Júnior" Morales, singer
 Isabel Preysler, socialite
 José Rizal, national hero of the Philippines
 Geraldine Roman, journalist and Philippine politician
 Fernando Zóbel de Ayala y Montojo, artist

Spanish people of Filipino descent
 Paulino Alcántara, footballer
 Luis Eduardo Aute, musician and film director
 Marcelo Azcárraga Palmero, thirteenth Prime Minister of Spain
 Shaila Dúrcal, singer
 Ángel and Juan Luis Guirado, footballers
 Julio and Enrique Iglesias, singers
 Jorge Moragas, Spanish politician
 Carli de Murga, footballer
 Javier Patiño, footballer

See also
Filipino people of Spanish ancestry
Demographics of Spain
Philippine–Spanish Friendship Day

References

Bibliography

External links
EAMiSS – Equip d'Atenció i Mediació Intercultural i Sociosanitari, a Filipino social welfare organization based in Barcelona
Asociación Cultural Galeón de Manila, a Spanish Filipino cultural organization based in Madrid

 
Ethnic groups in Spain
Filipino diaspora by country